General elections were held in Belgium on 17 February 1946. The result was a victory for the Christian Social Party, which won 92 of the 202 seats in the Chamber of Representatives and 51 of the 101 seats in the Senate. Voter turnout was 90.3%.

They were the first elections after the Second World War and saw fundamental changes among the political parties. The Flemish National Union, which held 17 seats prior to the war and collaborated with Nazi Germany during the war, was outlawed. The Catholic Party changed into the Christian Social Party while the Belgian Labour Party changed into the Belgian Socialist Party. The Liberal Party suffered major losses, while the Christian Social Party and the Communist Party made major gains.

Following the elections, Paul-Henri Spaak formed a Socialist minority government supported by the Communists. After he failed to win the confidence of the Christian Social and Liberal parties, outgoing PM Achille Van Acker formed a new government which included Socialists, Communists and Liberals.

Results

Chamber of Deputies

Senate

References

1946 elections in Belgium
February 1946 events in Europe